Kristine Hermosa Orille-Sotto (born September 9, 1983), professionally known by her maiden name Kristine Hermosa, is a Filipino actress. She is known for her roles in Pangako Sa ’Yo (2000–2002), Sana'y Wala Nang Wakas (2003–2004), and Dahil May Isang Ikaw (2009–2010).

She gained back-to-back success locally and abroad, from 2000 to 2010, with multiple successful soap operas.

She was teamed up with Jericho Rosales on Ang Munting Paraiso and 3 primetime drama series. She was also paired with Diether Ocampo, her former husband, in 'Til Death Do Us Part (2005) and Palimos ng Pag-ibig (2007). She was paired with TJ Trinidad in Gulong ng Palad (2006) and Prinsesa ng Banyera (2007-2008).

A Filipino and Movie and Primetime TV Icon during her run in the 2000's she is also a Filipino actress A-Lister when she was paired in film and tv Projects with A-List Movie and TV stars such as Jericho Rosales, Aga Muhlach, Vic Sotto, and Diether Ocampo. She has also starred in sitcoms essaying away from her successful Primetime dramas such as Hay, Bahay! (2016–2017), aired on GMA and the Your Song sunday anthology series (2006–2012).

Personal life
On September 21, 2004, she married actor Diether Ocampo. Their marriage ended shortly after and was officially nullified on January 30, 2009.

Hermosa married actor and host Oyo Boy Sotto on January 12, 2011. They have five children.

Acting career
Hermosa was discovered at age 12 when her older sister Kathleen auditioned for a show in ABS-CBN. She was cast in the 1998 weekly drama series, Sa Sandaling Kailangan Mo Ako. In 2000, she was cast in the primetime soap opera, Pangako Sa ’Yo, alongside Jericho Rosales. She starred in the film Forevermore, released in 2002. In 2003–2004, she starred in Sana'y Wala Nang Wakas.

She also played the lead role in the short-lived drama 'Til Death Do Us Part in 2005. Hermosa appeared in Gulong ng Palad and Prinsesa ng Banyera in 2006 and 2007 respectively and in Dahil May Isang Ikaw in 2009.

Her last project on ABS-CBN was the action-fantasy series Noah where she played a diwata, the counterpart of a fairy in Philippine mythology.

In 2016, she starred in GMA's weekly sitcom Hay, Bahay! with her husband Oyo Boy Sotto, Vic Sotto and Ai-Ai delas Alas, her first major role as a Kapuso artist.

In 2018, she returned to teleseryes through a very special role in the adventure-fantasy drama Bagani, her comeback project on ABS-CBN.

Filmography

Television

Films

Awards, recognitions and nominations

References

External links

1983 births
Living people
Bicolano actors
Bicolano people
Filipino women comedians
Filipino film actresses
Filipino television actresses
Filipino people of Spanish descent
Star Magic
ABS-CBN personalities
GMA Network personalities
Kristine
Filipino child actresses